Harley Davidson and the Marlboro Man is a 1991 American neo-Western biker film starring Mickey Rourke and Don Johnson, with a supporting cast including Chelsea Field, Tom Sizemore, Daniel Baldwin, Giancarlo Esposito, and Vanessa Williams who also contributes to the film's soundtrack. It is directed by Simon Wincer from a screenplay by Don Michael Paul.

The film was a critical and financial failure, grossing $7 million at the domestic box office, against an estimated budget of $23 million.

Plot 
In the near future, a man called Harley Davidson (like the Harley-Davidson motorcycle company) travels from Texas to Burbank, California to reconnect with his old friend Robert Lee "Marlboro Man" Edison (named after the Marlboro Man cigarettes advertising figure) at their old haunt; Rock N' Roll Bar & Grille. Their mutual friend Jack Daniels (like Jack Daniel's brand of Tennessee whiskey) holds animosity towards Harley over an affair he and his now-wife Lulu had years prior. The bar has fallen on hard times, and the Great Trust bank has threatened foreclosure, planning to demolish the building to make way for a skyscraper. Harley and Robert convince Jack to help them rob one of the Bank's armoured cars in order to collect the funds necessary to renew the building's lease. The robbery mostly goes off without a hitch, but the trio are intercepted by a group of security agents who almost foil their getaway. Upon escaping, they discover the loot they stole from the van contains not money, but a new, experimental street drug called "Crystal Dream."

The bank's head of security Alexander is ordered by CEO Chance Wilder to recover the stolen drugs and kill the thieves. Meanwhile, Robert is pulled over for speeding by a motorcycle cop, his ex-lover Virginia Slim (like Virginia Slims cigarettes). The two spend the night together, during which Robert learns that she's engaged. Harley takes Virginia to breakfast the next morning, during which she tells him that Crystal Dream is 100% addictive and causes lasting neurological damage and, eventually, death. Robert, fuming about Virginia's upcoming marriage, steals her fiancé's motorcycle. He and Harley go to the bank's headquarters and talk to Wilder via telephone. They demand $2.5 million in exchange for the drugs. Wilder agrees to have someone meet them that night in the airplane graveyard for the exchange. Alexander shows up with the money and the transfer goes off without any problems. That night, while they hang out in the bar's back room celebrating, Marlboro is suspicious of the ease of the exchange. Suddenly, Alexander and his men show up. Watching through a one-way mirror, the owner tries to convince them that the gang isn't there. Alexander appears to walk away as if to leave and suddenly turns around and shoots him. They open fire on the room behind the mirror; Harley and Marlboro are the only ones who escape alive as the others are cut down in brutal fashion.

The two retreat to the nearby airport and hide in the baggage compartment of a plane. One of the agents nearly finds them but they escape to Las Vegas, where they check into a hotel, only to be tracked down by Alexander. The two escape to the hotel's roof and jump off into the swimming pool. Harley finds out that they've been tracked with a device hidden in the dollar coin given to them by Alexander. The two hop a freight train headed east after deactivating the tracker, but Marlboro leaves after telling Harley that they owe it to the dead friends that helped them to go back to LA and settle things. Harley refuses to go and Marlboro jumps off the train. Harley has a change of heart, and catches up with Marlboro and they form a plan to meet with Alexander, reactivating the tracker in the coin. Alexander traces them to the airplane graveyard, finding the briefcase that contained the money but only finding the dollar coin inside. However, he sights Harley and Marlboro nearby and a gunfight ensues. Marlboro is able to kill both of Alexander's two remaining men, however, Alexander catches Marlboro and holds him hostage. Harley tries to shoot Alexander and misses, hitting Marlboro. Harley finally summons up the aim to hit Alexander and the two finally manage to kill him.

The duo bribe Alexander's helicopter pilot into taking them to Wilder's office. They give Wilder his money back and demand he change the lease on the bar. Wilder is unwilling to do so and orders his men to kill them when the pilot, paid off by Harley and Marlboro, appears hovering in his chopper outside. He opens fire on the office with the chopper's cannon, killing Wilder's thugs. Wilder insults Marlboro's dead father; Marlboro begins to beat him up until Wilder dangles out the window of his office, holding onto Marlboro's disintegrating cowboy boot. Harley helps him out, the boot comes apart and Wilder falls to his death.

Marlboro and Harley part ways at a rodeo, where Marlboro is riding a bull. As Harley rides away, he picks up a beautiful female hitchhiker.

Cast

Soundtrack 

Other songs in the film, but not included on the soundtrack are "Stop the World" by The Screaming Jets, "Wanted Dead or Alive" by Bon Jovi, and "Work to Do" and "The Better Part of Me" by Vanessa Williams.

Reception 
Rotten Tomatoes, a review aggregator, reports that 25% of 20 surveyed critics gave it a positive review; the average rating was 4.4/10. Kevin Thomas of the Los Angeles Times called it "a mindless cobbling from countless buddy movies". Owen Gleiberman of Entertainment Weekly rated it C+ and called it "a kinetic formula shoot-'em-up" that is "engagingly junky entertainment with a healthy sense of its own ludicrousness." Variety called it "a dopey, almost poignantly bad actioner about two legends-in-their-own-minds". Vincent Canby of The New York Times wrote, "Mr. Rourke and Mr. Johnson handle their roles with more ease and humor than can be accommodated by a movie so stuffed with mindless fistfights, gunfights, helicopter chases, explosions and leaps from tall buildings." Time Out London called it "utter rubbish, and badly dressed at that." Kim Newman of Empire wrote, "For a while, its crassness is amusing, but as the plot sets in, it gradually turns into a stultifying bore."
Johnson and Rourke have spoken negatively of the film. Rourke cited the film as the beginning of his decline in mainstream Hollywood. Johnson, while promoting the film, gave a tongue-in-cheek interview where he was quoted as saying “If you're a fan of mindless action, if you don’t have a single brain cell in your head, this is the film for you.”

Audiences surveyed by CinemaScore gave the film a grade of "B" on scale of A+ to F.

The film was nominated for Worst Picture at the 1991 Stinkers Bad Movie Awards.

Home media
Harley Davidson and the Marlboro Man was released to DVD by MGM Home Entertainment on February 20, 2001, and on Blu-Ray by Shout! Factory (under license from MGM) on May 19, 2015.

See also 
 List of American films of 1991

References

External links 

 
 
 

1990s road movies
1990s science fiction action films
1991 Western (genre) films
1991 action films
1991 films
1991 science fiction films
American road movies
American buddy action films
American science fiction action films
American Western (genre) films
1990s English-language films
Fictional duos
Films about alcohol
Films about bank robbery
Films about drugs
Films about smoking
Films directed by Simon Wincer
Films scored by Basil Poledouris
Films set in 1996
Films set in Los Angeles
Films set in the future
Films set in the Las Vegas Valley
Films shot in the Las Vegas Valley
Films shot in Los Angeles
Metro-Goldwyn-Mayer films
Motorcycling films
Neo-Western films
1990s American films